is a 1947 Japanese drama film directed by Kōzaburō Yoshimura. The film won the 1947 Kinema Junpo Award for Best Film.

Plot
After Japan's defeat in the Pacific War, the wealthy Anjō family have to give up their mansion and their way of life in the wake of the post-war agrarian reform. While the widowed father Tadahiko grieves for the lost social status, and both the cynical son Masahiko and the older sister show only contempt for their lower-class ex-lovers who they dropped, the younger daughter Atsuko accepts the new circumstances and tries to find her own place in the new Japan. Tadahiko decides to hold one last ball at the house before leaving, which results in numerous confrontations, including Tadahiko and ruthless businessman Shinkawa, to whom he is indebted, and Masahiko and his fiancée Yōko, Shinkawa's daughter. Towards the end of the festivity, Tadahiko officially presents his geisha mistress as his life partner to the noble guests. After the ball has ended, he tries to commit suicide, but is held back by Atsuko.

Cast
 Setsuko Hara as Atsuko Anjō 
 Osamu Takizawa as Tadahiko Anjō 
 Masayuki Mori as Masahiko Anjō 
 Yumeko Aizome as Akiko Anjō
 Masao Shimizu as Ryūzaburō Shinkawa 
 Keiko Tsushima as Yōko Shinkawa
 Chieko Murata as Chiyo

Legacy
The British Film Institute included The Ball at the Anjo House in its "Best Japanese film of every year" list, pointing out the film's "inventive camerawork" and "superb performances", in particular those by Setsuko Hara and Masayuki Mori, and calling it "stylish", "moving" and "inteligent". Film historian Donald Richie drew parallels between Kaneto Shindō's script and Anton Chekhov's The Cherry Orchard in his book A Hundred Years of Japanese Film.

Awards
 1948: Kinema Junpo Award for Best Film of the Year 
 1948: Mainichi Film Award for Best Actor Masayuki Mori

References

External links
 

1947 films
1940s Japanese-language films
1947 drama films
Japanese black-and-white films
Best Film Kinema Junpo Award winners
Shochiku films
Japanese drama films